Events in the year 1785 in India.

Incumbents
 Rulers ruled the land.

Events
National income - ₹10,217 million

References

 
India
Years of the 18th century in India